AlAnsar  is a Libyan football club based in Bayda, Libya.

References

Al Ansar
Association football clubs established in 1984
1984 establishments in Libya